Scopula convictorata is a moth of the family Geometridae. It is found in Colombia.

References

Moths described in 1874
convictorata
Moths of South America